Liu Zhiming may refer to:

 Zhiming Liu (computer scientist) (born 1961), Chinese computer scientist
 Liu Zhiming (athlete) (born 1989), Chinese Paralympic athlete